Jaz is a beach in the Budva Municipality in Montenegro. It is located 2.5 km west of Budva. It consists of two parts, one 850 m long and the other, formerly a nudist beach, 450 m long. It is a pebble beach, with a campground along the greater part of the beach (capacity 2,000 lots).

While it is among the longer beaches in Montenegro, and is a popular beach for sunbathing and camping, it has gained international prominence as a host of numerous concerts and happenings in recent years.

The vast hinterlands of the Jaz beach are considered among the greatest potentials for tourism development on the Montenegrin coast, as there are few undeveloped areas left on the coast besides Jaz (notably Buljarica, Velika Plaža and Ada Bojana).

Concert location

With the spring 2007 announcement of The Rolling Stones playing the beach in July 2007, Jaz Beach started to figure as open-air concert location for global acts. However, by summer 2009 the concerts ended.

The annual summer events were seen as an attempt to boost Montenegro's international image, as well as to promote the country as a tourist destination. In largest part they've been financed by Svetozar Marović, influential Montenegrin politician, and a native of Budva.

Summer 2007 and summer 2008
The Rolling Stones played a show on July 9, 2007, as a part of their A Bigger Bang Tour. For the performance, a large field in the beach hinterland was leveled, fenced, and made accessible by refurbishing and extending the road to the venue. The show was attended by approximately 40,000 people and the city of Budva holds the distinction of being the smallest town ever to host a Rolling Stones gig.

The next notable event on the beach was the 3-day Live Fest held in August 2008 that consisted of: Lenny Kravitz and Armand Van Helden on August 5, Dino Merlin and DJ Set Retro Groove '70 on August 6, and finally Goran Bregović together with Zdravko Čolić on August 7.

Later that summer Madonna performed one of her Sticky & Sweet Tour concerts at the venue on September 25 with 47,524 people in attendance. The pre and after parties consisted of performances by various other popular musicians, such as Van Gogh, Garik Sukachev, David Morales, Junior Jack and DJ Ura.

Live Music Festival 2009 Controversy
From early 2009, the organizers began touting the Live Music Festival to be held during summer 2009 with acts such as Tina Turner, Britney Spears, and Zucchero being announced.

Raka Marić has confirmed that none of those singers will attend it this year. For popular daily newspaper Vijesti, he has said: "Due to 2009 global financial crisis, there will be no attendance of some global superstar on this year's Live Music Festival." Although Tina Turner has finished her worldwide tour that marked her 50th year in the business and is now free for new concerts, Marić has said that "she gave up touring and will never tour again" which is, of course, not actually the truth. He has also said that "Britney Spears is finishing her European leg in July 26" so they couldn't "get her to come".

Although it has been officially confirmed that 2009 guests will be Vlado Georgiev, Plavi Orkestar, Riblja Čorba and two famous DJs, second Live Music Festival has never been held.

Summer Fest 2012
After a three-year absence, the musical performances returned in summer 2012 with the three-day event called Summer Fest organized from 5–8 August. Instead of globally known acts, the festival featured local ones such as: Nagual, Night Shift, Van Gogh, Hladno Pivo, Nipplepeople, Off Duty, S.A.R.S., Pero Defformero, Partibrejkers, Riblja Čorba, The Beatshakers, Gomila Nesklada, Who See, Prljavi Inspektor Blaža i Kljunovi, Kiki Lesendrić & Piloti, Orthodox Celts, and Junior Jack.

Sea Dance Festival 2014 
Sea Dance Festival 2014, a three-day summer music festival, was held at Jaz beach from 15 to 17 July 2014. The festival, which was part of the EXIT Adventure, hosted "BE HUMAN!" charity event at the Dukley Gardens, and featured acts from Jamiroquai, Underworld, Example Live, Bad Copy, Darkwood Dub, Kiril Džajkovski ft. TK Wonder, Eddy Temple-Morris, Eyesburn, Juan Atkins, Klingande, Lollobrigida, Mark Knight, Neno Belan & Fiumens, Patife, Rambo Amadeus, Roger Sanchez, Tara McDonald, Timo Maas, Urban & 4, Who See.

See also
 Budva
 Budva Riviera 
 Petrovac
 Buljarica
 Sveti Stefan

References

Beaches of Montenegro
Music venues in Montenegro
Budva